Selahattin Çobanoğlu (born 20 August 1985 in Mersin) is a Turkish sprinter and middle distance runner. He usually competed at the 800 metres events.

Çobanoglu represented his country at the 2004 Summer Olympics in Athens, Greece. He was eliminated in the first round at the 800 metres competition. He won a silver medal at the 2005 Summer Universiade held in their country.

Çobanoğlu holds the Turkish record at the 600 metres with 1:17.23.

His brother Utku Çobanoglu is a sprint and middle-distance runner like himself.

References

External links

1985 births
Living people
Turkish male sprinters
Turkish male middle-distance runners
Athletes (track and field) at the 2004 Summer Olympics
Olympic athletes of Turkey
Turkish male athletes
Universiade medalists in athletics (track and field)
Universiade silver medalists for Turkey
Medalists at the 2005 Summer Universiade
21st-century Turkish people